Skaters' Meadow is a  nature reserve in Cambridge. It is managed by the Wildlife Trust for Bedfordshire, Cambridgeshire and Northamptonshire.

The meadow is flower-rich wet grassland. Flora include common spotted orchids, cuckooflowers, meadowsweets, marsh-marigolds and ragged-robins. There are also grass snakes and birds such as blackcaps.

There is no access to the site, but it can be viewed from the road called Grantchester Meadows.

References

Wildlife Trust for Bedfordshire, Cambridgeshire and Northamptonshire reserves